Sir Henry Strakosch GBE (9 May 1871 – 30 October 1943) was an Austrian-born British banker and businessman. As a Jewish financier, his close ties to Winston Churchill were exploited by Nazi propaganda during the 1930s and World War II, and by Holocaust deniers in later years.

Early life
His parents were the merchant Edward Strakosch and his wife, Mathilde (née Winters). He was born at Hohenau, Austria, and educated at the Wasa Gymnasium in Vienna and privately in England.

Strakosch entered banking in the City of London in 1891, and then began working for the Anglo-Austrian Bank of South Africa in 1895. Strakosch became a naturalized British citizen in 1907.

Financial career
Strakosch served as a financial adviser to the South African government, and was the author of the 1920 South African Currency and Banking Act. He was chairman of the South African goldminers, Union Corporation from 1924.  He was a member of the Royal Commission on Indian Currency and Finance during 1925 and 1926. He later served on the Council of India between 1930 and 1937, served as a delegate for India at the Imperial Economic Conference in 1932, and acted as adviser to the Secretary of State for India between 1937 and 1942.

He was knighted in 1921, and then appointed a KBE in 1924, and promoted GBE in 1927.  He was awarded an honorary degree of LLD at Manchester University in 1938.

Strakosch was chairman of The Economist between 1929 and 1943. He supplied Winston Churchill with figures on German arms expenditure during the latter's political campaign for rearmament.

Strakosch provided financial support to Churchill in 1938 and 1940, which enabled Churchill to pay off his vast debts and to withdraw his Kent home Chartwell from sale at a time of severe financial pressures. Nazi propaganda exploited this to claim that Churchill was under the control of Zionist bankers, an anti-Semitic trope also repeated by Holocaust denialists such as David Irving.
Strakosch was unmarried until 1941 when he married Mabel Elizabeth Vincent, widow of Joseph Temperley, a shipowner.

He died at his home at Walton-on-Thames, Surrey, in 1943 aged 72.

Publications 
 The South African Currency and Exchange Problem, Johannesburg, 1920.
 The South African Currency and Exchange Problem Re-Examined, Johannesburg, 1922.
 Monetary Stability and the Gold Standard, London, 1928.
 A Financial Plan for the Prevention of War, London, 1929.
 The Crisis. A memorandum, supplement to The Economist, 9 January 1932.

References 

 Harold Gilmore Calhoun: Les théories de Sir Henry Strakosch en matière de crise et la crise de 1929–1933. Loviton, Paris 1933.

External links
 
Interwar Papers and Correspondence  of Roy Harrod

1871 births
1943 deaths
Austrian Jews
Members of the Council of India
Austro-Hungarian emigrants to the United Kingdom
Knights Grand Cross of the Order of the British Empire
Knights Bachelor
Businesspeople awarded knighthoods
British Jews
British people of Austrian-Jewish descent
British bankers
Naturalised citizens of the United Kingdom